The 1999 Broadland District Council election took place on 6 May 1999 to elect members of Broadland District Council in England. This was on the same day as other local elections.

Election result

References

1999 English local elections
May 1999 events in the United Kingdom
1999
1990s in Norfolk